Peter Knight (born 12 March 1965) is an Australian musician and composer. He is the artistic director of the Australian Art Orchestra and founding member of Melbourne group Way Out West., 5+2 Brass Ensemble and Clocked Out.

He is best known for his solo albums Fish Boast of Fishing (2011) and Allotrope (2012) and composition for theatre in particular with performance maker Tamara Saulwick.

Early life
Peter Knight grew up in Orbost in country Victoria then went to school in Melbourne. He started playing trumpet when he was at primary school.

Career

In collaboration
Knight played trumpet, electric bass and banjo in rock bands through his 20s including Cattletruck, which toured Australia extensively. He also toured and recorded with Big Pig, Frente, Underground Lovers, You Am I Spiderbait and many others.

Way Out West formed in 2002 with the intention of exploring jazz as a global language while simultaneously responding to Knight's local neighbourhood, Melbourne's inner west. The band has since released four albums mostly of Knight's compositions. They have won numerous awards and nominations and have played at major music festivals including Montreal, Veneto and Vancouver jazz festivals.

2000-2012: Solo career
In the late 1990s he concentrated on jazz and released his debut album as leader of Peter Knight Quartet in 2001 Between Two Moments.
The album was positively received and the Quartet toured nationally.

2013-present: Australian Art Orchestra
In 2013 Knight became Artistic Director of Australian Art Orchestra (AAO), following 20 years with the group's founder pianist and composer Paul Grabowsky. Under Knight, the group has pursued a more contemporary direction, collaborating with a number of well respected international composers, including Canadian composer Nicole Lizée and Japanese composer Keiichiro Shibuya. The development of their collaborations with Australian indigenous musicians, and musicians from Asia has continued under Knight's direction receiving critical acclaim. In 2014 the group won the AMC Art Music Award for Organisation of the Year at the APRA Awards.

In 2014 Knight was a Music Omi musician in residence at Omi International Arts Center, Hudson, New York.

In 2016 Knight won Albert H. Maggs Composition Award for his work Diomira. The winning work was commissioned by the Australian Art Orchestra and premiered at the Metropolis New Music Festival in May. This award came in the form of a commission to develop the piece into a full-length concert work.
 
In 2017 Knight performed at the 14th Jazztopad festival in Poland during the Melting Pot concerts.

At OzAsia 2017, Knight curated a concert program for the festival that saw the AAO collaborating with ghuzeng player Mindy Meng, Japanese composer Keiichiro Shibuya, p'ansori singer Bae Il Dong (Korea) and traditional songman from Arnhem Land, Daniel Wilfred.

Projects with Tamara Saulwick
Knight also works extensively with his partner, Tamara Saulwick, who is an internationally renowned performance maker and artistic director of Chamber Made Opera. Together they have made a number of works: Pin Drop, which won a Green Room Award in 2010 for Outstanding Production in Alternative and Hybrid Performance and was nominated for Best Composition and Sound Design. The pair was also commissioned by the ABC to turn this project into a radiophonic work

Pin Drop toured Australia and also played in Glasgow at Tramway in 2014.

Alterwas a performance using a constructed sound and light installation featuring 16 iPads (each participant used an iPad during the performance). The piece was commissioned for the Festival of Live Art by Arts House.

Seddon Archives was a headphone audio walk commissioned by Big West Festival. Endings which won a 2016 Green Room Award and toured through 2017-18 to Canadian Stage (Toronto), Brighton Festival (UK), Dublin Theatre Festival, pUsh Festival Vancouver and On the Boards (Seattle). The ABC commissioned a radiophonic version of Endings in 2016.

Academic achievements
In 2003, Knight was awarded the Alan C. Rose Memorial Fund Project Scholarship. In 2004, the  Keith and Elizabeth Travelling Fellowship. In 2006 he received a Myer Foundation grant for new sound installation work with Double Venturi.
In 2007, he received a Griffith University full scholarship for doctoral studies in composition and a Tom and Isobel Rolston Scholarship Banff Centre for the Arts.

Knight holds an MMus Master in Music Performance from University of Melbourne (VCA) and is also a Doctor of Musical Arts, which was awarded by Queensland of Conservatorium Griffith University QCGU. In 2013 he was awarded QCGU Alumnus of the Year.

In 2013, he was granted the Australia Council Music Fellowship (for 2013/14).

Discography

Solo albums

See also
 Way Out West (jazz group)

Awards and nominations

AIR Awards
The Australian Independent Record Awards (commonly known informally as AIR Awards) is an annual awards night to recognise, promote and celebrate the success of Australia's Independent Music sector.

|-
| AIR Awards of 2012
| Fish Boast of Fishing
| Best Independent Jazz Album
| 
|-

Albert H. Maggs Composition Award
The Albert H. Maggs Composition Award is a commission-based Australian classical composition award given in order to "encourage and assist composers who might otherwise abandon their efforts for want of means". They commenced in 1966.

|-
| 2016
| Himself for Diomira
| Albert H. Maggs Composition Award
| 
|-

APRA Awards

The APRA Awards are presented annually from 1982 by the Australasian Performing Right Association (APRA), "honouring composers and songwriters".

|-
| 2008 || "Postcard from Footscray" || Jazz Work of the Year || 
|-
| 2012 || "Unknownness 1" || Jazz Work of the Year || 
|-
| rowspan=2| 2015 || rowspan=2| himself|| Award for Excellence in Jazz || 
|-
| Award for Excellence by an Individual || 
|-
| 2016 || himself || Award for Excellence by an Individual || 
|-
| 2017 || "Diomira" (performed by Australian Art Orchestra) || Instrumental Work of the Year|| 
|-
| 2020 || "The Plains" (performed by Australian Art Orchestra) || Performance of the Year: Jazz / Improvised Music|| 
|-
| 2021 || Closed Beginnings (Knight, Tariro Mavondo, Reuben Lewis) for Mavondo (poetry), Lewis and Knight (music), Jem Savage (sound production), Leo Dale (video production) || Work of the Year: Electroacoustic/Sound Art || 
|-

ARIA Music Awards
The ARIA Music Awards is an annual ceremony presented by Australian Recording Industry Association (ARIA), which recognise excellence, innovation, and achievement across all genres of the music of Australia. They commenced in 1987.

! 
|-
| 2021|| Closed Beginnings (with Australian Art Orchestra, Reuben Lewis and Tariro Mavondo) || ARIA Award for Best Jazz Album || 
| 
|-
| 2022
| Hand to Earth (with Australian Art Orchestra, Daniel Wilfred, Sunny Kim & Aviva Endean)
| ARIA Award for Best World Music Album
| 
|

Australian Jazz Bell Awards
The Australian Jazz Bell Awards are annual music awards for the jazz music genre in Australia. They were named in honour of Australian jazz pianist, composer and band leader, Graeme Bell (1914–2012).

|-
| 2012
| Fish Boast of Fishing
| Most Original Australian Jazz Album
| 
|-

Green Room Awards
The Green Room Awards are peer awards which recognise excellence in cabaret, dance, drama, fringe theatre, musical theatre and opera in Melbourne.

|-
| 2011
| Pin Drop (with Tamara Saulwick)
| Best Composition and Sound Design 
| 
|-
| 2016
| Endings (with Tamara Saulwick)
| Green Room Theatre Award
| 
|-

Helpmann Awards
The Helpmann Awards are accolades for live entertainment and performing arts in Australia, presented by industry group Live Performance Australia.

|-
| 2015
| Endings (with Tamara Saulwick)
| Helpmann Award for Best New Australian Work
| 
|-

Music Victoria Awards
The Music Victoria Awards, are an annual awards night celebrating Victorian music. They commenced in 2005.

! 
|-
| 2016
| Way Out West
| Best Jazz Album
| 
| 
|-
| 2022
| Peter Knight
| Best Jazz Work
| 
| 
|-

References

External links
 

1965 births
Living people
APRA Award winners
Australian jazz composers
Male jazz composers
Musicians from Melbourne
People from Orbost
University of Melbourne alumni